Vișan is a village in Bârnova Commune, Iași County, Romania.

It is also the surname of:
Dorel Vișan (born 1937), Romanian actor
Gheorghe Vișan, original name of Romanian literary critic, historian, novelist, academician and journalist George Călinescu (1899–1965)
Ioana lui Vișan, pseudonym of Romanian poet and editor N. T. Orășanu (1833–1890) 
Monica Vișan (born 1979), Romanian mathematician
Nicolae Vișan (1956–2017), Romanian ice hockey player
Paula Vișan, goalkeeper for Romanian women's handball team HC Zalău
Raymond Vișan, French-Romanian restaurateur, creator of Buddha Bar